Jacques Def (born 11 November 1962) is a French gymnast. He competed in eight events at the 1984 Summer Olympics.

References

1962 births
Living people
French male artistic gymnasts
Olympic gymnasts of France
Gymnasts at the 1984 Summer Olympics
Place of birth missing (living people)
20th-century French people